Curraghmore near Portlaw, County Waterford, Ireland, is a historic house and estate and the seat of the Marquess of Waterford. The estate was part of the grant of land made to Sir Roger le Puher (la Poer) by Henry II in 1177 after the Anglo-Norman invasion of Ireland.

Curraghmore House is the Beresford family estate that once covered 100,000 acres (400 km2). Curraghmore near Waterford in South East Ireland, had stables for 100 horses and employed 600 people. The family were involved in hunting, to the extent that members of the family have been killed in a riding accident.  Now surrounded by c.3,500 acres of formal gardens, woodland and grazing fields making this the largest private demesne in Ireland.
Group tours of the main reception rooms of Curraghmore House can be arranged by prior appointment.

The estate was owned by the la Poer (Power) family for over 500 years, during which time the family gained the titles Baron la Poer (1535), and Viscount Decies and Earl of Tyrone (1673, second creation). However, in 1704 the male line of the la Poers became extinct.  The estate was inherited by Lady Catherine la Poer who married Sir Marcus Beresford in 1717.  He was elevated to the peerage in 1720 as Baron Beresford and Viscount Tyrone, and in 1746 he was created 1st Earl of Tyrone (third creation).  The Beresford-Power family have held the estate ever since.  The 1st Earl's eldest son George was created 1st Marquess of Waterford in 1789.  The current Lord Waterford, Henry Nicholas de la Poer Beresford, 9th Marquess of Waterford inherited the title on the death of his father John Hubert de La Poer Beresford, 8th Marquess of Waterford in February 2015 and moved into Curraghmore.  Lord and Lady Waterford plan to develop the estate, promote tourism and open the house more regularly.

It is believed that a castle was erected on the site in the twelfth century, however the core of the current house is a medieval tower-house.  This was extended in 1700 when a house was built around a court with the medieval tower-house incorporated at the north-eastern side. A forecourt with stables was added in the 1750s or 1760s and the house was refurbished in the 1780s. Samuel Usher Roberts, a grandson of the Waterford architect John Roberts, is credited with encasing the main block of the house in the late 19th century.  The forecourt, flanked by ranges of outbuildings, is described by the National Inventory of Architectural Heritage as “without precedent or parallel in Ireland”.

Further reading

 Letitia Elizabeth Landon, in Fisher's Drawing Room Scrap Book, 1832, Curraghmore (a poetical illustration to a painting by William Henry Bartlett)
 Ryland, Rev. R.H.  1824 The history, topography and antiquities of the city and county of Waterford. London.
 John Murray; Simington, R.C. (ed.)  1942 The Civil survey, AD 1654–1656. Vol VI: County of Waterford. Dublin. Irish Manuscripts Commission.
 Smith, C. 1746 The Ancient and Present State of the County and City of Waterford. A. Reilly. Dublin.

References

County Waterford
Historic Houses in County Waterford